The Fawn River is a  river in southwest Michigan and northeast Indiana in the United States. It flows into the St. Joseph River in the city of Constantine, Michigan. The headwaters rise in a series of lakes and marshes in northern Steuben County, Indiana near Pokagon State Park, where it is known as "Crooked Creek" and "Little Fawn River". It flows west-northwest across the northeast corner of LaGrange County, Indiana and then over the state line across the southeast corner of Branch County, Michigan before entering St. Joseph County, Michigan. Passing to the south of Sturgis, Michigan, the river meanders across the state line a few more times before flowing north into Constantine. Except for Constantine, the river does not flow through any large communities, although it passes near Fremont, Indiana, Orland, Indiana, Sturgis, Howe, Indiana, and White Pigeon, Michigan.

Fawn River Township, Michigan is named after the river.

Drainage basin 
The drainage basin for the Fawn River and tributaries includes all or portions of the following:
 Steuben County, Indiana
 Fremont Township
 Jamestown Township
 Millgrove Township
 LaGrange County, Indiana
 Greenfield Township
 Lima Township
 Van Buren Township
 Branch County, Michigan
 California Township
 Gilead Township (portion of southwest corner drains into Anderson Lake
 Kinderhook Township
 Noble Township
 St. Joseph County, Michigan
 Constantine Township
 Fawn River Township
 Florence Township
 Sherman Township
 Sturgis Township
 White Pigeon Township

Tributaries 
(from the mouth)
 (left) Fawn River Drain
 (left) Klinger Lake
 Tamarack Lake
 Thompson Lake
 (left) Pickerel Lake
 Aldrich Lake
 (right) Wenger Ditch
 (left) Nye Drain
 (right) outflow from Cedar Lake
 Meteer Lake
 Duff Lake
 (left) outflow from Lee Lake
 Williams Lake
 Baker Lake
 Dark Lake (Nigar Lake/Lake Johnson)
 Cade Lake
 Sweet Lake
 (left) Himebaugh Drain
 (left) outflow from Long Noble Lake
 Royer Lake
 Mallow Lake
 Fish Lake
 Honey Lake
 (left) outflow from Lime Lake
 Anderson Lake
Becomes the Crooked Creek
 (right) outflow from Tamarack Lake
 Warner Lake
 Chair Factory Lake
 Rhodes Lake
 Lime Lake
 Lake Gage
 Crooked Lake
 Loon Lake
 Center Lake
 (right) outflow from Bell Lake
 Jimmerson Lake
 Lake James
 Snow Lake
 Follette Creek
 Big Otter Lake
 outflow from Walters Lake
 Little Otter Lake
 outflow from Green Lake
 Marsh Lake
 Seven Sisters Lakes
 Lake Minfenokee
 Lake George
 Silver Lake
 Huyck Lake
 Little Fawn River
 Fish Lake

See also
List of rivers of Indiana

References 

Rivers of Indiana
Rivers of Michigan
Rivers of Branch County, Michigan
Rivers of St. Joseph County, Michigan
Rivers of Steuben County, Indiana
Rivers of LaGrange County, Indiana
Tributaries of Lake Michigan